Bill Steele (born 21 February 1940) is a Hong Kong sailor. He competed in the Flying Dutchman event at the 1972 Summer Olympics.

References

External links
 

1940 births
Living people
Hong Kong male sailors (sport)
Olympic sailors of Hong Kong
Sailors at the 1972 Summer Olympics – Flying Dutchman
Place of birth missing (living people)